is an action-adventure game developed by Nintendo Research & Development 1 (R&D1) and published by Nintendo for the Game Boy Advance on February 9, 2004. It is a remake of the original Metroid (1986), and retells the story with updated visuals and gameplay.

Like other Metroid games, the player controls bounty hunter Samus Aran, who travels to planet Zebes after learning that the Space Pirates are experimenting with Metroids, hostile parasitic creatures. The gameplay focuses on exploration, with the player searching for power-ups to reach previously inaccessible areas. The remake adds items, additional areas, mini-bosses, difficulty levels and a rewritten story that explores Samus's past.

Zero Mission received acclaim for its new content, graphics, gameplay and improvements over the original, though it received minor criticism for its short length. The game received several honors, including a 46th-place ranking in a list of the Top 200 Games compiled by Nintendo Power. It was also named the ninth-best Game Boy Advance game by IGN. It had sold over 439,000 units in the United States and 69,000 in Japan as of February 2005. The game was released on the Wii U's Virtual Console in Japan on June 19, 2014, in PAL regions on March 12, 2015, and in North America on January 14, 2016.

Gameplay

Metroid: Zero Mission takes place on Planet Zebes, a large, open-ended world with areas connected by doors and elevators. The player controls Samus Aran as she travels through the planet's caverns and environments, hunting Space Pirates. Along the way, the player collects power-ups that enhance Samus's armor and weaponry, as well as grant her special abilities. These abilities allow Samus to access areas that were previously inaccessible, so that the game can be played linearly or non-linearly. For example, the player may come across caverns that bypass certain sections, a method termed sequence breaking. To save their progress, players can enter either Save Rooms or Samus's ship on Crateria. As a remake of Metroid, Metroid: Zero Missions layout bears a resemblance to the original, and various powerups and items make reappearances from previous games in the series, with similar uses, effects, and appearances. However, the game adds new items, areas, and mini-bosses, as well as a completely new area named Chozodia.

Zero Mission is the first game in the Metroid series to include a sequence in which the player controls Samus without her Power Suit. In this portion of the game, Samus is more vulnerable to damage, must crawl through ducts on her hands and knees without the help of her Morph Ball mode, and has a weak pistol that briefly stuns enemies as her only weapon. Notably, Samus still retains all energy tanks she acquired previously.

Completion of the game unlocks an emulated version of the original Metroid game.  Zero Mission also allows players to unlock the Metroid Fusion picture gallery by linking between Zero Mission and Fusion cartridges via the Game Boy Advance Game Link Cable.

Plot

Space Pirates attack a Galactic Federation-owned space research vessel and seize samples of Metroid creatures. Dangerous floating organisms, Metroids can latch on to any organism and drain its life energy to kill it. The Space Pirates plan to replicate Metroids by exposing them to beta rays and then using them as biological weapons to destroy all living beings that oppose them. While searching for the stolen Metroids, the Galactic Federation locates the Space Pirates' base of operations on the planet Zebes. The Federation assaults the planet, but the Pirates resist, forcing the Federation to retreat. As a last resort, the Federation decides to send a lone bounty hunter to penetrate the Pirates' base and destroy Mother Brain, the mechanical life-form that controls the Space Pirates' fortress and its defenses. Considered the greatest of all bounty hunters, Samus Aran is chosen for the mission.

Samus lands on the surface of Zebes and explores the planet, traveling through the planet's caverns. She eventually comes across Kraid, an ally of the Space Pirates, and Ridley, the Space Pirates' commander, and defeats them both. Along the way, Samus finds and destroys Mother Brain. While Samus leaves the planet in her gunship, it is attacked by Space Pirates, causing it to crash back onto Zebes, near the Space Pirate Mothership. With both her Gunship and Power Suit destroyed, Samus infiltrates the Mothership, eventually leading her to Chozodia, where a Chozo Statue offers her a trial. Upon passing the trial, Samus is rewarded with a new fully upgraded Power Suit. Continuing to explore the Mothership, Samus eventually reaches the Mecha Ridley, a robot built in the likeness of Ridley. After defeating it, Samus escapes the planet using one of the Space Pirate's shuttles, while the Mothership self-destructs.

Development
Metroid: Zero Mission was directed by Yoshio Sakamoto, a Nintendo veteran who has been involved with the Metroid series since its debut with the Nintendo Entertainment System game, and has played a role in every game in the series except for Metroid II. Sakamoto was the only member of the original Metroid development team to work on Zero Mission.

While working on the concept for the next Metroid game after Metroid Fusion was released in 2002, one of the developers for Fusion suggested that Super Metroid be ported to the Game Boy Advance; however, Sakamoto decided to port the original Metroid instead. The development team decided to return to the roots of Metroid gameplay by creating a game based on the NES original. Sakamoto, noting that Fusions gameplay and structure were drastically different from previous games, wanted to "show people who had never played a Metroid game prior to Fusion, the roots of the Metroid franchise, that this is what Metroid is, this is the style of gameplay that Metroid sprang from [...] at the same time, retell the story of Samus's original mission".

One of the biggest challenges that the developers faced was adding enough elements to Zero Mission to make it feel new, while keeping the spirit of the original Metroid. Because both games were made for the Game Boy Advance, Zero Mission uses a rebuilt version of the game engine used for Fusion so that it did not need to be built from scratch. This marked the first time two Metroid installments have been released for the same video game console. Metroid Fusion had offered connectivity with Metroid Prime on the Nintendo GameCube, and Zero Mission was planned to offer similar functionality with Metroid Prime 2: Echoes, but these plans ultimately fell through. Sakamoto explained that because there was not enough development time for Zero Mission, compounded by the fact that both of their release dates were too far apart, the team was prevented from doing so. They did, however, manage to include the ability for Fusion to connect with Zero Mission.

In addition to retelling the plot from Metroid, Zero Mission introduces new cinematics to push the story forward. Sakamoto believed in the importance of having a story to complement a game. He found it particularly difficult to convey the game's plot accurately in a way that the player can understand, because of the sparse use of dialogue in the Metroid series. The story for Metroid: Zero Mission was rewritten to explore Samus Aran's backstory more than in the original Metroid. Cinematics are used to show Samus' memories to move the story forward and to keep the plot open for interpretation. Sakamoto claimed that this was intended to expand the original story while retaining some mystery. The game is the first in the series to let the player choose a difficulty level at the start of the game; each of three levels varies in the amount of damage caused by enemies with the third option only unlocked after finishing the campaign once. The battle with Mother Brain marked the end of the original Metroid, but Zero Mission offers an extra story segment featuring Samus in her blue Zero Suit.

Release
Nintendo first revealed Metroid: Zero Mission at the E3 convention in 2003, and its North American release date of February 9, 2004 was announced later that year. In other territories, Zero Mission was released in Australia on March 19, in Europe on April 8, and in Japan on May 27. The game was later re-released on the Wii U Virtual Console in Japan on June 19, 2014. This was followed by the release in Europe on March 12, 2015, and in North America on January 14, 2016.

Zero Mission was ranked the best-selling Game Boy Advance game in the United States in its debut month of February 2004, selling 151,807 units, and it was the 3rd best-selling game across all video game systems in that month. By May, the game's sales dropped to 7th among Game Boy Advance games, with 31,619 copies sold and $938,681 in revenue. By February 2005, the game had sold over 439,000 units in the United States and 69,000 in Japan.

Reception

Metroid: Zero Mission was given "generally favorable reviews", according to Metacritic. The game was praised by a number of reviews, several which called it one of the best games available for the Game Boy Advance. Japanese game magazine Famitsu gave the game a score of 34 out of 40. X-Play and GamePro enjoyed the game; X-Play said the game was "perfect for blasting space pirates on the go", and GamePro was "constantly surprised" with what the game offered. GameZone said it surpassed the "style and addictive action" of Metroid Fusion. Nintendo World Report called the game a masterpiece and the perfect example of how a Metroid game should be done, saying that the designers carefully mixed all the best elements from the other games and layered them on top of the original level design and concepts of the original Metroid. Eurogamer appreciated every minute of the game, affirming that Metroid: Zero Mission should be considered one of the best games available for the Game Boy Advance.

A number of reviews were pleased with the new content added to Metroid: Zero Mission. Game Informer appreciated the new material, and believed that fans of the Metroid series would "absolutely adore" Metroid: Zero Mission, which they considered one of the greatest video games in the history of gaming. 1UP.com considered Metroid: Zero Mission to be one of the "most ambitious, comprehensive and successful" remakes for a game such as Metroid, noting that "Metroid: Zero Mission expands on its source material with refined control, gameplay ideas retrofitted from its sequels, new plot hooks for subsequent chapters of the saga, and some innovations which add new layers of complexity to the series.

Criticism of the game stemmed from its short length. Regarded as a "weak one-shot experience", IGN felt that players would enjoy the game only after they had completed it and played it again. Eurogamer was also critical of the length. Even though GamesRadar liked the game's quality, they said that Nintendo should have "[made] the experience last longer". GameSpot was disappointed with the "short-lived experience", but blamed the game's captivating quality that compelled them to complete the game in a few sittings. Calling Metroid: Zero Mission stale, GameSpy asserted that players less familiar with Metroid games would get more enjoyment out of it because of its similarities to previous Metroid games.

The game was ranked the 46th-best game for any Nintendo system in Nintendo Powers Top 200 Games list. In their March 2010 issue, the magazine also ranked Metroid: Zero Mission as the eighth-best game to be released on a Nintendo console in the 2000 decade, in their "Best of the Decade" feature. Metroid: Zero Mission was voted IGN'''s Game Boy Advance Game of the Month for February 2004, and IGN staff named it the best Game Boy adventure Game of 2004 and the ninth best Game Boy Advance Game. GameSpot also named it the best Game Boy Advance game of February 2004, and nominated it for the year-end "Best Game Boy Advance Game" award. Electronic Gaming Monthly also named it the best handheld game of 2004. Official Nintendo Magazine ranked the game 94th in a list of the best Nintendo games. Nintendo Power also ranked it the best Game Boy Advance game of all-time in its August 2011 issue. In 2020, IGN named Zero Mission'' the fifth-greatest video game remake.

References
Notes

Citations

External links
 
 Metroid: Zero Mission at the Metroid Database

2004 video games
Game Boy Advance games
Interactive Achievement Award winners
Zero Mission
Nintendo Research & Development 1 games
Single-player video games
Stealth video games
Video game remakes
Video games developed in Japan
Video games featuring female protagonists
Video games scored by Kenji Yamamoto (composer, born 1964)
Video games set on fictional planets
Virtual Console games
Virtual Console games for Wii U
Metroidvania games
Video games set in outer space